The 1973 Mestaruussarja, the premier division of Finnish football, was contested by 12 teams, and HJK Helsinki won the championship.

League standings

Results

References
Finland - List of final tables (RSSSF)

Mestaruussarja seasons
Fin
Fin
1